Norris de Mouilpied Darrell, Jr. (1899–1989) was an American attorney and President of the American Law Institute from 1961 to 1976. He graduated from the University of Minnesota Law School, and was the son-in law of Judge Learned Hand. He clerked for United States Supreme Court Justice Pierce Butler and joined the New York law firm Sullivan and Cromwell in 1925. His grandson Trevor Darrell is a computer-vision researcher.

See also 
 List of law clerks of the Supreme Court of the United States (Seat 10)

References

New York (state) lawyers
Tax lawyers
Lawyers from New York City
University of Minnesota Law School alumni
1899 births
1989 deaths
Law clerks of the Supreme Court of the United States
Place of birth missing
Sullivan & Cromwell people
20th-century American lawyers